Wild Horse Mesa is a 1925 American silent Western film directed by George B. Seitz and starring Jack Holt, Noah Beery Sr., Billie Dove, and Douglas Fairbanks Jr. Based on the novel Wild Horse Mesa by Zane Grey, the film is about a rancher who, desperate for money, decides to trap and sell wild horses using barbed wire. The local Navajo tribe tries to persuade him not to do it. The film was produced by Famous Players-Lasky and released by Paramount Pictures. Wild Horse Mesa was filmed on location in Colorado. Prints of the film have survived.

Plot
As described in a film magazine reviews, Lige Melberne and his men plan to corral a herd of wild horses by driving them into a barbed wire trap in the canyon of Wild Horse Mesa. Weymer stumbles into their camp. He and Sue at once are infatuated. Chess Weymer, brother of Chane, is also in love with Sue. Upon seeing the barbed wire fence built to corral the horses, Chane Weymer warns the party that it will kill half the herd to drive them into the wire. Weymer, Melbeme, and Sue try to take the fence down and save the oncoming horses but the others in the Melberne party attack Melbeme and Weymer and tie them. As the horses come into view Sue, cuts Weymer’s bonds and he is into the saddle to head them off. He captures the king horse for his share of the booty. However, when Sue offers to marry him if he will give the poor creature its freedom, he is struck with the pathos of her situation and frees the horse with no fee. The freed horse starts up the side of the mountain and leads the herd away from the wire to safety. The girl then falls in the arms of Weymer.

Cast

References

External links

 
 
 
 Theater advertisement at silentfilmstillarchive.com
 

1925 films
1925 Western (genre) films
Films based on works by Zane Grey
Famous Players-Lasky films
Films directed by George B. Seitz
American black-and-white films
Silent American Western (genre) films
1920s American films
1920s English-language films